Joanna Sophia of Bavaria (c. 1373 – 15 November 1410) was the youngest daughter of Albert I, Duke of Bavaria and his first wife Margaret of Brieg. She was a member of the House of Wittelsbach.

On 13 June 1395, Joanna Sophia married Albert IV, Duke of Austria in Vienna. The marriage between the two ended a feud between Joanna Sophia's father and Albert's father, Albert III of Austria. Joanna Sophia's father agreed to the payment of 10,000 Pfennige and he gave Albert III the fortress of Natternberg and the town of Deggendorf.

The marriage produced two children; both of whom survived to adulthood. They were:
 Albert V (16 August 1397–27 October 1439, Neszmély, Hungary).
 Margaret (26 June 1395, Vienna–24 December 1447), married in Landshut 25 November 1412 to Duke Henry XVI of Bavaria.

Albert would often quarrel with members of Joanna Sophia's family, such as their brother-in-law Wenceslaus, King of the Romans and his half-brother Sigismund, Holy Roman Emperor. This ended only when Albert died in 1404. Joanna Sophia arranged marriages for her children. She made negotiations with Frederick, Duke of Bavaria, to marry her daughter, Margaret to his son, Henry XVI, Duke of Bavaria. Henry and Margaret married two years after Joanna Sophia's death.

Her son Albert married Elizabeth of Luxembourg, the only child of Emperor Sigismund.

Joanna Sophia died aged thirty-six or thirty-seven in Vienna.

Ancestors

References 

1370s births
1410 deaths
Daughters of monarchs
Year of birth uncertain
14th-century German nobility
14th-century German women
15th-century German nobility
15th-century German women
House of Wittelsbach
Austrian royal consorts
14th-century House of Habsburg
15th-century House of Habsburg